Dark Shadows (later referred to as Dark Shadows: The Revival) is an American prime time gothic soap opera television series which aired on NBC from January 13 to March 22, 1991. A re-imagining of the 1966–71 ABC daytime gothic soap opera Dark Shadows, the revival was developed by Dan Curtis, creator of the original series.

Series story line 
The 1991 Dark Shadows tells a streamlined version of the original storyline – the arrival of governess Victoria Winters at Collinwood, vampire Barnabas Collins being released from his coffin, Dr. Hoffman's attempt to cure Barnabas' vampirism medically, and, finally, Victoria's time travel back to 1790 to witness the events in which the still-human Barnabas is transformed into an undead creature.

Development and production 
Having declined several previous inquiries about reviving Dark Shadows, Curtis was contacted by NBC's then-head of programming Brandon Tartikoff in the summer of 1987. The reluctant Curtis was eventually persuaded by Tartikoff, who "wouldn't let up".

Of the revival Curtis said, "The essential characters and relationships are the same, but the things they do are different. I thought I could rely on those old scripts, but I found that they were full of crazy plots that we couldn't use. So all the incidents are different; we arrive at similar points through a much different route."
According to Curtis, he co-wrote and directed the first five episodes himself, "to get it off in the style I wanted." However, Curtis received co-writing credit on only two completed episodes. The revival series was produced by MGM Television, whose parent company had produced the two earlier theatrical films, House of Dark Shadows and Night of Dark Shadows, (now owned by Warner Bros./Turner Entertainment). A majority of the series was filmed at the Greystone Park and Mansion in Beverly Hills, California, and some period wardrobe from the 1988 film Dangerous Liaisons was used.

Cast

Main cast members

Supporting cast members

Episodes

Ratings and cancellation 
Dark Shadows premiered as a four-hour miniseries event on January 13 and 14, 1991, and then moved to a regular Friday night schedule. The series debuted to great success, averaging a 22 share for the first three episodes. But due to the onset of the Gulf War which was fully televised at the same time as Dark Shadows on most stations including NBC, the latter station was frequently forced to interrupt or move broadcasts. For this reason, the show faltered, as ratings declined, and struggled to keep its audience. In addition to the war, some fans blame the declining ratings on the focus of NBC's promotions which relied upon horror and vampire themes rather than the romantic fantasy elements. With the 12th and last episode of the season ranked 64th among 83 shows, Dark Shadows was cancelled. NBC received over 7,000 letters of protest from disappointed fans, who also picketed network headquarters in both Los Angeles and New York City.

Media releases and rebroadcast 
The original VHS release from MPI Home Video features an extended pilot episode and extended final episode, and also presents the original one-hour versions of episodes 2 and 3 (for broadcast, NBC combined them into a movie-length version so they could air that and the pilot as a 2-night mini-series to kick off the series premiere), so the home video presentation of episode 3 restores the "I'm Victoria Winters" opening narration that was left out of the movie-length version (the one-hour versions of these two episodes are also the ones that were shown when the series was repeated on the Sci-Fi Channel).

The 2005 DVD release from MGM Home Video, although re-mastered in High Definition, contained alterations to the original image presentation. Firstly, the overall image was cropped from the original full-screen image to a 1.78:1 widescreen ratio. Secondly, after remastering, certain scenes that were shot "day for night" (shot in daylight, but meant to be altered in post-production to look like night-time) were incorrectly left untreated, presenting the problem of a vampire walking around in broad daylight. Also, this release presented the episodes the way they were shown on NBC, meaning episodes 2 and 3 were the "movie length" version and the unaired footage from the MPI release was not included at all (not within the context of the episode or even as a bonus feature).

The deleted film footage from the V.H.S. release can be seen on YouTube.
  
The DVD version has been re-released in 2009 since that time in different packaging.

Dark Shadows has been shown in reruns on the Sci-Fi Channel and Chiller. Since 2009 the series has been available for viewing online on Hulu.

See also 
 List of vampire television series

References

External links 

 

Dark Shadows
1990s American drama television series
1990s American horror television series
1990s American supernatural television series
1991 American television series debuts
1991 American television series endings
American television soap operas
American primetime television soap operas
English-language television shows
NBC original programming
Saturn Award-winning television series
Television series by MGM Television
Television series reboots
Vampires in television
Television series about vampires